Council Julian Dunbar Jr. (August 4, 1922 – September 14, 2020) was an American politician in the state of South Carolina. He served in the South Carolina House of Representatives as a member of the Republican Party from 1971 to 1972, representing Allendale County, South Carolina. He was an insurance agent.

Dunbar graduated from Allendale High School in 1941. He played professional baseball with the Miami Seminoles and the Augusta Tigers. He served in the United States Navy during World War II. Dunbar worked with the South Carolina Highway Patrol and was commissioned a lieutenant.

References

1922 births
2020 deaths
People from Allendale County, South Carolina
Military personnel from South Carolina
Baseball players from South Carolina
Businesspeople from South Carolina
Augusta Tigers players
Republican Party members of the South Carolina House of Representatives
20th-century American politicians
United States Navy personnel of World War II